Abingdon Historic District is a national historic district located at Abingdon, Washington County, Virginia. The district encompasses 145 contributing buildings, 2 contributing site, and 13 contributing structures in the town of Abingdon.  It includes a variety of residential, commercial, and institutional buildings dating from the late-18th century to the mid-20th century.  Notable contributing resources include Sinking Spring Cemetery, William King High School (1913), General Francis Preston House (1832), Martha Washington Inn, Barter Theatre, the Virginia House, Alexander Findlay House (1827), Gabriel Stickley House (c. 1830), Ann Berry House (c. 1830), Washington County Courthouse (1868), Rev. Charles Cummings House (c. 1773), and James Fields House (1857).  Located in the district and separately listed are the Abingdon Bank and Dr. William H. Pitts House.

It was listed on the National Register of Historic Places in 1970, with a boundary increase in 1986.

References

Historic districts on the National Register of Historic Places in Virginia
Buildings and structures in Washington County, Virginia
National Register of Historic Places in Washington County, Virginia